Turkey has participated in the Eurovision Song Contest 34 times since its debut in 1975.

Turkey's other top five results are Athena, Kenan Doğulu, Hadise, who all finished fourth, and Manga, who finished second.

, they are yet to return to the contest having stated similar reasons for their absence each year.

History

Turkish Radio and Television Corporation involvement in the Eurovision Song Contest 
The national broadcasting service of Turkey, the Turkish Radio and Television Corporation (TRT), was one of the founding members of the European Broadcasting Union (EBU) in 1950 along with eighteen countries around Europe, including Tunisia. As an intercontinental country (with lands in Eastern Thrace and Western Asia), Turkey takes part in a multitude of Western organizations including NATO as of 1952 and the European Economic Community as an associate member as of 1959.

TRT televised the Eurovision Song Contest between 1973 and 2012, even during years in which Turkey was not participating in the contest.

1970s 
Greece did not take part in the contest for "unknown reasons" according to the EBU, but it was later revealed that the withdrawal was in protest of Turkey's debut and their invasion of Cyprus in 1974. TRT organized a national final to select the first ever Turkish entrant to the Eurovision Song Contest. The final took place on 9 February 1975 in the studios of TRT and was hosted by Bülend Özveren. The winning song, "Seninle Bir Dakika" ("A minute with you") by Semiha Yankı, was picked by averaging the ranks from the professional jury and people's jury. At the close of voting during the contest, the song received only three points from Monaco and placed last.

In 1976, Greece's entry to the contest aroused controversy due to its subject matter being the Turkish invasion of Cyprus. Turkey withdrew from the contest to protest the political background of Greece's entry, called "Panagia Mou, Panagia Mou." Turkey televised the final on 3 April 1976 but censored the Greek entrant's performance. They played a nationalist Turkish song titled "Memleketim" ( "My motherland", the Turkish cover of the Yiddish folk song "Rabbi Elimelekh"), which was one of the symbols of the Turkish invasion of Cyprus in Turkey.

Turkey did not take part in the contest again until 1978, placing 18th with the song "Sevince" performed by Nazar and Nilüfer.

The  was held in Jerusalem. The Turkish entry selected was "Seviyorum" ("I'm in love") by Maria Rita Epik. However, Turkey withdrew from the contest due to pressure from neighboring Arab countries to do so, which arose from the ongoing controversy regarding the status of Jerusalem.

1980s 
Turkey participated in the Eurovision Song Contest consistently throughout the 1980s. In , Turkish superstar Ajda Pekkan and the song "Petrol" was selected by TRT through a national final. Pekkan placed 15th with 23 points, including the first ever score 12 points received by Turkey, coming from Morocco.

Several famous Turkish artists performed for the contest during the 1980s, including Ajda Pekkan, Neco, Candan Erçetin and MFÖ.

1990s 
The contest's popularity in Turkey suffered after Kayahan, one of the most famous singers in the country, placed 17th out of 22 participating countries with 21 points. After Kayahan's poor result, Turkey's Eurovision entrants were mostly unknown or amateur singers until .

Şebnem Paker represented the country in two consecutive years. The first time being in 1996 where she qualified for the final and placed 12th, and the second in 1997 where she placed third, behind the UK and Ireland, with the song "Dinle" ("Listen"), sung in Turkish.

Turkey reached the top 10 for a second time since 1986, and landed in the top three for the first time, making it the most successful result for the country until its victory in 2003. Şebnem Paker returned to the Turkish national final in 1998, but placed fourth and did not qualify for the contest as the Turkish participant for a third consecutive year. Tüzmen represented the country and placed 14th.

2000s and 2010s 

Following the introduction of televoting in 1998, (initially trialed in 1997 and first implemented in Turkey in 1999), Turkey went on to achieve eight top 10 results in the contest.

"Everyway That I Can" was the first Turkish entry in the contest to be sung completely in English. TRT selected the entry through an internal selection mainly organised by OGAE Turkey.

The 2004 contest was held in the Abdi Ipekci Arena, with the first-ever semi-final held on 12 May, followed by the final on 15 May. From 2000, Turkey had seven songs sung in English and four sung in both English and Turkish, with just three (and ) songs sung entirely in Turkish.

Along with Greece, Turkey brought the contest a new outlook with flashy stage performances and dresses alongside their oriental/Mediterranean-flavoured pop music acts (Sertab Erener, Sibel Tüzün, Kenan Doğulu and Hadise). In 2004, 2008, 2010 and 2011, the country was represented by bands, most of them with rock-influenced songs with Ottoman, Eastern European and Balkan instruments. Athena ranked fourth in 2004, when the contest was held in Istanbul; Mor ve Ötesi ranked seventh with a song completely in Turkish in 2008 and the nu metal band Manga, named the Best European Act in the MTV Europe Music Awards 2009, ranked second in 2010. Yüksek Sadakat in 2011 placed 13th in the first semi-final of the contest and failed to qualify, marking the first and only time that Turkey failed to qualify for the final. In 2012, Turkey participated for the last time  with the song "Love Me Back" by Can Bonomo, which placed seventh in the final with 112 points.

Withdrawal 
The TRT cited the changes to the televote voting system, in which a jury was introduced and the significance of televoting decreased by 50%.

Turkey did not participate in any of the contests from 2013 to 2023. In August 2018, İbrahim Eren, the Director-General of TRT, stated that TRT does not plan to rejoin the contest and break the boycott for various reasons, citing Conchita Wurst's participation and eventual victory in 2014.

In June 2021, it was confirmed by both the EBU and Eren that they were in talks about the country potentially returning to the contest in the future.

Participation overview 

Notes:

Congratulations: 50 Years of the Eurovision Song Contest

Hostings

Awards

Marcel Bezençon Awards

Conductors

Commentators and spokespersons

Prior to 2012 every contest Turkey had taken part in had always been commentated on by Turkish television presenter Bülend Özveren, with the exception of 1982–1985, 1990–1991, 1998–2001 and 2007. In addition Özveren also co-commentated the contest in 1979, 2004, 2011 and 2012. Out of the 38 years Turkey have broadcast the event Özveren has commentated on 29 of them making him 9 years short of being the contest's longest commentator.

Photogallery

See also
 Music of Turkey
 Turkey in the ABU TV Song Festival
 Turkey in the Turkvision Song Contest

Notes

References

External links

Lyrics of all Turkish Eurovision entries
Points to and from Turkey eurovisioncovers.co.uk

 
Countries in the Eurovision Song Contest